The 1974 Norwich Union Open was the second edition of the invitational snooker tournament, which took place between 18 and 22 November 1974 at the Piccadilly Hotel in London. It was open to both professionals and amateurs and featured 16 players. Reigning champion John Spencer won 10–9 in the final against Ray Reardon.

Prize fund
The breakdown of prize money for this year is shown below: 
 Winner: £1,500
 Runner-up: £750
 Semi-final: £400
 Quarter-final: £200
 Last 16: £100
 Highest break: £100
 Total: £4,750

Main draw

References

Norwich Union Open
Norwich Union Open
Norwich Union Open